Cham Alpenblick railway station is a railway station in the municipality of Cham, in the Swiss canton of Zug. It is an intermediate stop on the standard gauge Zug–Lucerne line of Swiss Federal Railways.

Services 
The following services stop at Cham Alpenblick:

References

External links 
 
 

Railway stations in the canton of Zug
Swiss Federal Railways stations